Emotions Anonymous (EA) is a twelve-step program for recovery from mental and emotional illness.  there were approximately 300 Emotions Anonymous groups active in the United States and another 300 around the world.

History 
Marion Flesch (July 24, 1911 – October 10, 2004) is responsible for creating the groups that would become Emotions Anonymous. Marion was a graduate of St. Cloud State Teachers College (now St. Cloud State University) and at various times worked as a teacher, secretary, clerk, accountant, bookkeeper and office manager. Later in life she became a certified chemical dependency counselor through the University of Minnesota and started work on a master's degree, but stopped at age 80 due to health concerns. Marion originally went to Al-Anon meetings at the advice of a friend to help cope with panic attacks. Later Marion learned of another twelve-step program, Neurotics Anonymous and she started the first such meeting in Minnesota held April 13, 1966, at the Merriam Park Community Center in St. Paul. Neurotics Anonymous grew quickly in Minnesota, and by fall of 1966 there were thirty active groups in the state.

Differences developed between the Minnesota groups and the central offices of Neurotics Anonymous. The Minnesota Intergroup Association separated from Neurotics Anonymous on July 6, 1971. After unsuccessful attempts to reconcile differences with Neurotics Anonymous, the Minnesota groups later adopted the name Emotions Anonymous. They wrote to Alcoholics Anonymous World Services for permission to use the Twelve Steps and Twelve Traditions. Permissions were granted. Emotions Anonymous officially filed articles of incorporation on July 22, 1971.

Misconceptions

Purpose 
EA is not intended to be a replacement for psychotherapy, psychiatric medication, or any kind of professional mental health treatment. People may find useful as a complement to mental health treatment, as a personal means to better mental health in general, or when psychiatric treatment is not available or they have resistance to psychiatric treatment.  EA does not attempt to coerce members into following anyone's advice.

Intellectual disabilities and hospitalization 
Jim Voytilla of the Ramsey County, Minnesota, Human Services Department created EA groups for intellectually disabled substance abusers in 1979. Voytilla noted when this particular demographic of substance abusers attended AA meetings in the surrounding community, they felt uncomfortable and made others attending the meetings uncomfortable. Voytilla's EA meetings were created to avoid these problems, and address the illnesses of his clients other than substance abuse. Since then, four articles have narrowly defined EA as a program specifically for mentally retarded or intellectually disabled substance abusers. In a similar way, EA has also been incorrectly described as an organization either specifically or primarily for those who have been discharged from psychiatric hospitals.

EA does not discriminate against any demographic. All that is needed to join EA is a desire to become emotionally well. EA is not, and never has been, a program specifically for people of any particular background or treatment history. It is not uncommon for individuals in recovery from addictions or former patients in psychiatric hospitals to seek help in EA after being discharged.

Processes 
 For more details on this topic, see Self-help groups for mental health: Group processes and Twelve-step program: Process

Emotions Anonymous views mental and emotional illness as chronic and progressive, like addiction. EA members find they "hit bottom" when the consequences of their mental and emotional illness cause complete despair. Twelve-step groups symbolically represent human structure in three dimensions: physical, mental, and spiritual. The illnesses the groups deal with are understood to manifest themselves in each dimension. The First Step in each twelve-step group states what members have been unable to control with their willpower. In some cases the emphasis is on the experience in the physical dimension; in AA the First Step suggests admitting powerlessness over alcohol, in Overeaters Anonymous (OA) it is powerlessness over food. In other groups the First Step emphasizes the experience in the mental dimension; in NA the First Step suggests admitting powerlessness over addiction, in EA (as well as Neurotics Anonymous), it is powerlessness over emotions. Emotions Anonymous focuses on deviant moods and emotions, not just a craving for mood alteration. The subjective experience of powerlessness over one's emotions can generate multiple kinds of behavioral disorders, or it can be a cause of mental suffering with no consistent behavioral manifestation (such as affective disorders).

In the Third Step members surrender their will to a Higher Power, this should not be understood as encouraging passiveness, rather its purpose is to increase acceptance of reality. The process of working the Twelve Steps is intended to replace self-centeredness with a growing moral consciousness and a willingness for self-sacrifice and unselfish constructive action; this is known as a spiritual awakening, or religious experience.

Literature 
Emotions Anonymous publishes three books approved for use in the organization. Emotions Anonymous is the primary book, the Today book contains 366 daily meditation readings related the EA program, and It Works If You Work It discusses EA's tools and guidelines in detail.

Tools and guidelines for recovery 
All twelve-step programs use the Twelve Steps and Twelve Traditions, but most have their own specialized tools and guidelines emphasizing the focus of their program. EA developed the "Twelve Helpful Concepts," and "What EA Is...and Is Not." the "Just for Todays," as well as a slightly modified version of AA's Twelve Promises. The EA "Just For Todays" were adapted by a twelve-step organization for female victims of domestic violence with substance abuse histories, Wisdom of Women (WOW).

See also 
GROW
Neurotics Anonymous
List of twelve-step groups
Recovery International (formerly Recovery, Inc.)
Recovery model
Self-help groups for mental health

References

External links 
 Emotions Anonymous International
 Emotions Anonymous in Germany
 Emotions Anonymous in Japan
 

Emotion
Mental health support groups
Organizations established in 1971
Psychiatric rehabilitation
Twelve-step programs
Non-profit organizations based in Minnesota
1971 establishments in Minnesota